Mauro Bicicli (17 April 1935 in Crema – 22 August 2001 in Crema) was an Italian professional football player and coach, who played as a midfielder.

Death
Bicicli died in 2001 due to a liver tumour.

Honours

Club
Inter
 Serie A champion: 1962–63.

References

1935 births
2001 deaths
Italian footballers
Serie A players
Serie B players
Inter Milan players
Parma Calcio 1913 players
Catania S.S.D. players
Genoa C.F.C. players
L.R. Vicenza players
Brescia Calcio players
Italian football managers
Brescia Calcio managers
A.C. Legnano managers
Association football midfielders
A.S.D. Fanfulla managers